Lozotaenia straminea is a species of moth of the family Tortricidae. It is found on Corsica and Sardinia.

The wingspan is about 20 mm.

References

	

Moths described in 1936
Archipini